The Tamaulipas Institute of Higher Education, or IEST for its acronym in Spanish, is a private university in Altamira, Tamaulipas, Mexico founded in 1974. It is one of the most recognized universities along with ITESM Campus Tampico in the southern area of the state of Tamaulipas. It serves all the metropolitan area of Tampico, Ciudad Madero and Altamira, the northern part of the state of Veracruz and the eastern part of the state of San Luis Potosí. Its campus consist of Campus Altamira, and Campus Cd. Valles located in Ciudad Valles, San Luís Potosí.

Since 2005, it has been officially allied with the Anahuac Universities Network.

Organization
IEST's divisions consists of academic departments rather than faculties. Both undergraduate and graduate studies are available. IEST also provides the Preparatoria IEST (Secondary school), at campus Ciudad Valles, which consists of Upper and Lower Secondary Education (Preparatoria and Secundaria), with no undergraduate or graduate services.

Undergraduate
The academic departments, with their respective majors at campus Altamira for undergraduate level are:

Humanities
Architecture
Graphic Design
Law
Languages
Philosophy
Psychology
Exact Sciences
Chemistry
Information Technology and Telecommunications
Industry for Direction
Mechatronics
Petroleum and Renewable energy
Management and Economics
Finance and Accounting
International Business
Gastronomy
Direction and Management
Marketing
Tourist Management

Graduate
The academic departments, with their respective masters at campus Altamira for graduate level are:

Humanities
Education
Private law
Management and Economics
Corporate finance
Direction and quality education
Logistics and international business
Management
Marketing management
Administration of human capital
Taxes
Quality

Private universities and colleges in Mexico
Catholic universities and colleges in Mexico
Universities and colleges in Tamaulipas
Educational institutions established in 1974
Regnum Christi
Legion of Christ
Anahuac universities